Udestedt is a municipality in the Sömmerda district of Thuringia, Germany.

References

Sömmerda (district)
Grand Duchy of Saxe-Weimar-Eisenach